Aunt Bee is a fictional character from the 1960 American television sitcom The Andy Griffith Show. Played by Frances Bavier, the character migrated to the spinoff Mayberry R.F.D. (1968–1971) when The Andy Griffith Show ended its run in 1968, and remained for two years. Though she was the aunt of Sheriff Andy Taylor, virtually every character in Mayberry, even those in her age bracket such as Floyd and Emmett, called her "Aunt Bee."

Black-and-white seasons (1960–1965)
Aunt Bee, full name Beatrice Taylor, is the paternal aunt of widower sheriff Andy Taylor and great-aunt to his son Opie Taylor. In the premiere episode of The Andy Griffith Show, "The New Housekeeper," Aunt Bee returns to Mayberry after a five-year sojourn in Morgantown, West Virginia, when Andy's housekeeper Rose marries and leaves his house. Aunt Bee thereafter manages Andy's household and becomes Opie's surrogate mother and grandmother. Andy explains to Opie that he was raised by Aunt Bee, and Bee later mentions, without elaboration, having raised other Taylors. Bee is well known in Mayberry for her cooking skills. In the first episode, she serves a platter of fried chicken with all the trimmings, and thereafter her character is associated with wholesome, home-cooked meals. She frequently contributes meals to community or church events and brings picnic baskets of food to Mayberry's tiny jail for its lawmen and inmates. While Aunt Bee is celebrated for her cuisine, she falls short as a pickler and marmalade maker. Andy and Barney refer to her pickles as "kerosene cucumbers" and her marmalade as smelling like "ammonia" – though they keep these opinions from her, so as not to hurt her feelings. Her other food is very well regarded, and Andy is especially fond of her pork chops and cornbread biscuits, while Opie's favorite dish is her butterscotch pecan pie. Bee has several one-episode flirtations in the early seasons with men who prove to be cads.

Aunt Bee's other relatives sometimes come up in episodes; she speaks of trimming her brother's hair when a girl and, in one episode, her sister Nora visits. She also has a rapscallion cousin called Bradford J. Taylor who features in a color episode. Bee is a teetotaler. In an episode in which a traveling salesman comes to Mayberry peddling patent medicine, Andy tells Barney that Aunt Bee is heavily against alcohol due to her brother's trouble with the bottle. In the same episode, Bee plays the piano and speaks of her baptism. Bee is a member of the town choir and sings in church.

Color seasons (1965–1968)

Bee undergoes some changes during the final three color years of The Andy Griffith Show. In the early years, she gives her heart to scalawags of all sorts and sometimes needs Andy's help in extricating herself from unpleasant romantic situations. In the color years, however, Bee's suitors are respectable gentlemen and include a retired congressman, a clergyman, and a distinguished professor. Bee's evolution in personality is reflected in her dress. In the show's early years, she is given to wearing comically dowdy house dresses, fruit- and flower-decorated hats, and ladylike white gloves for venturing outside the house. In the color episodes, she discards her frumpy wardrobe and steps into more stylish attire.

More drastic in the evolution of the character than her taste-shift in men and her wardrobe about-face is her liberation from her homemaker role in Andy's house. In the later episodes, Bee leaves the Taylor kitchen to open her own restaurant, to host a television cooking show, to run for office, to buy a car, and to take flying lessons. Andy and Opie are sometimes left at home to prepare their own meals. In spite of her sudden spirit of independence, Bee never quite makes a complete break and continues to rely on Andy to direct the course of her life and make the difficult decisions.

Aunt Bee sees Opie grow from age 6 to 14. When Andy marries his longtime girlfriend Helen Crump on the spinoff Mayberry R.F.D., she opts to give the newlyweds their own space and becomes housekeeper for farmer Sam Jones (another widowed father) and his young son Mike. Residing at the Jones farm, Aunt Bee feeds the livestock and gathers eggs. The following year Andy and Helen move to Raleigh.  After two years as Sam's housekeeper, Aunt Bee leaves the Jones household for unspecified reasons to be replaced as housekeeper by Sam's cousin, Alice Cooper (Alice Ghostley).  This is the last we see of Aunt Bee.

In 1986, a made-for-television reunion movie called Return to Mayberry was broadcast on NBC. Although many original cast members reprised their roles, Frances Bavier had retired to Siler City, North Carolina in 1972, was in ill health, and declined to participate. In the television movie, it is revealed that Bee died before the events of the film, and Andy Taylor is seen reverentially visiting Aunt Bee's grave.

Aunt Bee's "romances"

Beginning with the second season, Aunt Bee had at least one flirtation (rarely, if ever, amounting to a true romance) per season. These flirtations added significant depth and interest to her character. In the black-and-white seasons, Bee threatened to give her heart to cads of all sorts and sometimes needed Andy's help in extricating herself from unpleasant situations. In the color years, however, Bee gained wisdom through experience. She paired herself with respectable gentlemen and managed her affairs without significant assistance from Andy. Of course there was never an implication of physical involvement.  In spite of Aunt Bee's propensity for affairs of the heart and her active pursuit of elderly bachelors, she was only engaged once—to a cruise-ship captain (played by Will Geer for two episodes) during season one of Mayberry RFD.

 Henry Wheeler, an itinerant handyman, uses Bee's romantic vulnerability to cadge himself free meals and shelter at the Taylors' (Second season: "Aunt Bee's Brief Encounter").
 Fred Goss, a chain-smoking dry cleaner, dates Bee when she believes her stay-at-home lifestyle inhibits Andy from pursuing his chances for dating and marrying (Second season: "Wedding Bells for Aunt Bee").

 Colonel Harvey (John Dehner), a traveling medicine man, sells Bee two bottles of his Indian elixir. Bee becomes tipsy on the brew and Colonel Harvey lands in jail (Third season: "Aunt Bee's Medicine Man").
 Briscoe Darling, a mountain man, becomes smitten with Aunt Bee and carries her off to his cabin in the hills. Andy rescues Bee but not before she makes Briscoe's life miserable (Fourth season: "Briscoe Declares for Aunt Bee").
 Roger Hanover is an old, out-of-town friend of Aunt Bee's. He visits Mayberry and loiters at the Taylor house, knowing Andy distrusts him, finally threatening he'll propose marriage to Bee unless Andy pays him to leave (Fifth season: "Aunt Bee's Romance").
 Orville Hendricks is a butter-and-egg seller whom Bee pretends to be dating when, goaded by Clara, she decides Andy needs space to pursue his romance with Helen (Fifth season: "Aunt Bee's Invisible Beau").
 John Canfield, a retired Congressman, dates Aunt Bee until the two become exhausted with their whirlwind activities (Sixth season: "Aunt Bee, the Swinger").
 Reverend Leighton, a visiting pastor, is impressed with Bee and considers accepting a parish near Mayberry. Bee believes he will think less of her when he learns she wears a wig (Seventh season: "Aunt Bee's Crowning Glory").
 Hubert St. John is a visiting lecturer who becomes smitten with Aunt Bee because she resembles his deceased wife (Eighth season: "Aunt Bee and the Lecturer").

Aunt Bee and Clara Edwards

Aunt Bee's closest friend in Mayberry is widow Clara Edwards (Hope Summers). Although Clara is a well-meaning woman, she often proves irksome when positioning herself as Bee's rival for the attentions of the single, older gentlemen passing through Mayberry. She vies with Bee in cooking contests and flower shows and replaces her in the town pageant when Bee realizes she has no talent for theatricals. Clara and Bee attended school together as girls, even playing on the same basketball team. They compose an anthem celebrating the good life in Mayberry and, in one episode, vacation in Mexico with their friend Myrtle. Clara is sometimes a petty and jealous woman, often ruining Bee's pleasure in one small thing or another with a dismissive sniff or an abrupt and cutting comment.

Notes and references

Bibliography
The Andy Griffith Show: Complete Series Collection. Paramount, 2007.
Beck, Ken, and Clark, Jim. The Andy Griffith Show Book. St. Martin's Griffin, 2000.
Kelly, Richard. The Andy Griffith Show. Blair, 1984.

The Andy Griffith Show characters
Fictional characters from North Carolina
Fictional characters from West Virginia
Television characters introduced in 1960
Female characters in television